Bis(5'-nucleosyl)-tetraphosphatase [asymmetrical] is an enzyme that in humans is encoded by the NUDT2 gene.

This gene encodes a member of the MutT family of nucleotide pyrophosphatases, a subset of the larger NUDIX hydrolase family. The gene product possesses a modification of the MutT sequence motif found in certain nucleotide pyrophosphatases. The enzyme asymmetrically hydrolyzes Ap4A to yield AMP and ATP and is responsible for maintaining the intracellular level of the dinucleotide Ap4A, the function of which has yet to be established. This gene may be a candidate tumor suppressor gene. Alternative splicing has been observed at this locus and three transcript variants, all encoding the same protein, have been identified.

References

Further reading

Nudix hydrolases